Oswald Thomas (born July 27, 1882 in Kronstadt [now Braşov in Transylvania, Romania]; died Feb. 13, 1963 in Vienna, Austria), was an astronomer and a protagonist of the popularization of astronomy in Germany and Austria.

Career
Thomas's father Karl, a girls' school director, imbued his son with the fascination of astronomical phenomenology from early on. In 1907 Oswald Thomas organized a formal registration system for fireball observations in his home town Kronstadt and named this institution Astronomisches Büro (Astronomical Bureau). Its tasks soon extended to a broader range of adult education in astronomy.

From 1910 to 1913 Thomas taught mathematics and physics at the German Gymnasium (high school) in Kronstadt. He relocated to Vienna, taking his Astronomical Bureau organization with him, and was a teacher at various private and public schools from 1913-1915 until he became head of the Urania observatory in Vienna (1915-1922, and again 1933–1934). When the first Zeiss projector planetarium to be installed outside of Germany was established in Vienna in 1927, Thomas became its chief astronomer. His standard presentation Der Himmel über Wien (The Sky Above Vienna) achieved huge popularity. It was performed over a thousand times, and according to Thomas it provided the inspiration for the first Zeiss planetarium to be set up in the United States (in Chicago).

In 1934 Thomas pointed out that the missing Messier object M48 actually was NGC 2548, an identification which became generally accepted only after T.F. Morris of the Royal Astronomical Society of Canada independently repeated it in 1959. He introduced the Summer Triangle (which he named "Great Triangle") as an asterism into the literature, and created an atlas of celestial constellations that is popular even today. Until his retirement Thomas gave over 7,000 public lectures, including 278 radio lectures.

After World War II Thomas had incessantly pushed for a new Vienna public planetarium, and in 1962 - at the age of 80 years - he was able to participate in the laying of its foundation. He was succeeded in most of his activities by Hermann Mucke whose teacher and mentor he had been. Oswald Thomas was cremated at Feuerhalle Simmering, where also his ashes are buried.

Honors
In 1941 the University of Vienna made Thomas an honorary professor for astronomy. In 1974 the place in the Prater where Vienna's current planetarium had been erected was named in his honor, and since 2004 the asteroid 29427 Oswaldthomas bears his name.

References

External links

20th-century Austrian astronomers
20th-century German astronomers
Austrian educators
1882 births
1963 deaths
Burials at Feuerhalle Simmering